This is a list of the people born in, residents of, or otherwise closely associated with the American city of Columbia, Missouri, and its surrounding metropolitan area.

Attending college in Columbia
Many people have lived in Columbia temporarily, while attending one of the city's institutions of higher education; such people are not included in this list.  For lists of people who attended college in Columbia see:
 List of Columbia College alumni
 List of Stephens College alumni
 List of University of Missouri alumni

A–D

James William Abert – soldier and explorer
Thomas M. Allen – clergyman
Benjamin Anderson – economist
Gary Anderson – football player
Judy Baker – politician 
Matt Bartle – politician
Simon Barrett – filmmaker
Rob Benedict – actor
Duane Benton – judge
Rebecca Blank – educator; U.S. Secretary of Commerce
Philemon Bliss – judge
John William Boone – musician
Stratton D. Brooks – college president
Fleda Brown – poet
Jessica Capshaw – actress
Russ Carnahan – politician
J'den Cox – wrestler, Olympic medalist
Kevin Croom - UFC Mixed Martial Artist
Jack D. Crouch – hotelier
Derek "Deke" Dickerson – musician

E–L

Carl Edwards – retired NASCAR driver
Jane Froman – singer; actress
Nicole Galloway – politician
Chuck Graham – politician
Ken Griffin – organist
Eugene Jerome Hainer – Nebraska politician
Jeff Harris – politician
William Least Heat-Moon – writer
Martin Heinrich – U.S. Senator from New Mexico
Peter Hessler – journalist
Darwin Hindman – mayor of Columbia (1995–2010)
Brett James – singer
William Jewell – educator, second mayor of Columbia
Leon W. Johnson – Air Force General
Tyler Johnson – baseball pitcher
Daniel Webster Jones – Mormon pioneer
John Carleton Jones – president of the University of Missouri
Lloyd E. Jones – United States Army major general
Kraig Kann – golf commentator
Henry Kirklin, horticulturalist, first black instructor at the University of Missouri
E. Stanley Kroenke – sports mogul
Sergei Kopeikin – astrophysicist
Ken Lay – chief executive, Enron
Grace Lee – radio and television personality
Guy Sumner Lowman, Jr. – linguist

M–S

Jeff Maggert – professional golfer
William Rainey Marshall – fifth Governor of Minnesota
William L. Nelson – politician
John Neihardt – poet
Don Nardo – author
Korla Pandit – musician
Carlos Pena Jr. – singer
Michael Porter Jr. - basketball player for Denver Nuggets
William Rainey Marshall – Minnesota Governor 
James S. Rollins – 19th-century politician
Jesse M. Roper – 19th-century naval officer
Charles Griffith Ross – press secretary for U.S. President Harry S. Truman
Felix Sabates – philanthropist
Therese Sander – farmer; politician
Philip Schaefer - entrepreneur; poet
Max Schwabe – politician
Jon Scott – television journalist
John F. Shafroth – Colorado politician
Clay Shirky – writer
Apollo M. O. Smith – aviation executive
William Smith – actor
William J. Stone – 28th Governor of Missouri

T–Z

Blake Tekotte – baseball player
Malcolm Thomas – professional basketball player
Nischelle Turner – television personality
Zbylut Twardowski – nephrologist
Charlie Van Dyke – radio personality
Andrew VanWyngarden – musician
James "Bud" Walton – co-founder, Wal-Mart
Sam Walton – co-founder, Wal-Mart
Edwin Moss Watson – editor; publisher
Norbert Wiener – mathematician
Lisa Wilcox – actress
Roger B. Wilson – 52nd Governor of Missouri

See also

List of people from Missouri
List of cemeteries in Boone County, Missouri

References

Columbia, Missouri
Columbia
 
People from